Mukhosh is a 1990s blues band based in Dhaka, Bangladesh. The band was formed by Khalid Hossain Raju (vocals) and S M Khosrose Mohit (drummer) in 1997. They released their first self-titled album Mukhosh from the banner of recording company Soundtek in 2000. After 2000, the band was inactive for 17 years and reappeared with their second album Digital Bhalobasha in December 2017.

History 
The band was formed in March 1997. The founding members of the band were Khalid Hossain Raju and S M Khosrose Mohit. They named the band “Mukhosh”, which means “Mask”. Their first self-titled album was from the banner of recording company Soundtek in 2000. After releasing this album the band team received audience response and that time a couple of singles became very popular. They had to take a long break due to professional reasons after 2001. In 2016, Mukhosh had a reunion and decided to run the band professionally. Then they started practicing again and released their second album Digital Bhalobasha in December 2017.

Discography

Popular songs 
Aey Orna
Boro Hobe
Dekha Jaak
Dhur Chai
Ichche Gulo
Jorina
Kabliwala
Ke Boleche
Lat Pat Kore
Opekkha
Probashi
Shanti Chai Shanti
Fb Page Like//Rayofmusic (Shid Bhuiyan)

Band members

1997–2001 
 S M Khosrose Mohit – Drummer and band leader
 Khalid Hossain Raju – Guitar and vocal
 Bullet Shamim – Keyboard and vocal
 Abu Muhit Mintu – Bass and vocal

2016–present 
 S M Khosrose Mohit – Drummer and band leader
 Khalid Hossain Raju – Guitar and vocal

References

External links 
 

Experimental musical groups
Bangladeshi blues musical groups